The Rainbow Trail is a 1932 Pre-Code Western film directed by David Howard and starring George O'Brien. The picture is an adaptation of Zane Grey's novel of the same name and a sequel to the 1931 film Riders of the Purple Sage, which also stars O'Brien.

Cast
George O'Brien as Shefford
Cecilia Parker as Fay Larkin
Minna Gombell as Ruth
Roscoe Ates as Ike Wilkins
J. M. Kerrigan as Paddy Harrigan
James Kirkwood as Venters
W. L. Thorne as Dyer
Robert Frazer as Lone Eagle
Ruth Donnelly as Abigail
Niles Welch as Willets
Landers Stevens as Presby
Laska Winter as Singing Cloud
Edward Hearn as Jim Lassiter
Alice Ward as Jane Withersteen
George Burton as Elliott
Iron Eyes Cody as Indian

References

External links
 
 
 The Rainbow Trail in Reel Old Films
 The Rainbow Trail in TV Guide

1932 Western (genre) films
1932 films
Films directed by David Howard
American Western (genre) films
Films based on American novels
Fox Film films
American sequel films
American black-and-white films
1930s American films
1930s English-language films